Awarua may refer to:

Places
Awarua, Northland, a community near Tautoro, New Zealand
Awarua Plains, a large area of wetland in Southland, New Zealand
Awarua Point, a landform in West Coast, New Zealand

Other uses
Awarua (gastropod), a genus of gastropods in the family Architectonicidae
Awarua (New Zealand electorate), a New Zealand Parliamentary electorate, from 1881 to 1996
Awarua Street railway station, a station on the Johnsonville Branch north of Wellington, New Zealand
Awarua Radio, a historic coast radio station on the Awarua Plains
Awarua Tracking Station, an Earth station on the Awarua Plains

See also
Avarua